Youth Residential Complexes were housing projects intended for young families  and constructed by their future tenants themselves, subsidized by industrial enterprises. This approach existed since 1971 and it was a mass movement until the dissolution of the Soviet Union. It was an attempt to alleviate the residential construction crisis in the late Soviet Union. Construction of Youth Residential Complexes continued in modern Russia, although based on a different business model, based on a market economy.

The first complex was built in Korolev City, one of Russian's naukograds (science cities).

See also
Center for Scientific and Technical Creativity of the Youth
Student construction brigade

References

Economy of the Soviet Union
Youth organizations based in the Soviet Union